Yana Mulyana (born 17 February 1965) is an entrepreneur, businessman, and politician who is the current Mayor of Bandung, serving in 2022 as a replacement for Oded Muhammad Danial.

Before he served as Vice Mayor of Bandung, Yana was an entrepreneur. He also owns a property business and several other business lines. He is also the founder of Radio Rase FM. Yana's work at Rase FM began in 1987 when he continued the licensing process for the establishment of Radio Rase, which had previously been delayed.

Education 
 SD Negeri Panorama
 SMP Negeri 15 Bandung
 SMA Negeri 5 Bandung
 Universitas Islam Nusantara

References 

http://www.pikiran-rakyat.com/bandung-raya/2018/01/11/yana-mulyana-di-balik-rase-fm-dan-impian-mengubah-bandung-417722

1965 births
Living people
Indonesian Muslims
Great Indonesia Movement Party politicians
People from Bandung